The Revival Fellowship is a conservative Pentecostal church based in Australia.

The Revival Fellowship has assemblies in Australia, Bali, Brazil, Cameroon, Canada, the Democratic Republic of the Congo, the Czech Republic, Fiji, France, Germany, Hungary, India, Ireland, Côte d'Ivoire, Japan, Kenya, Nepal, the Netherlands, New Zealand, Papua New Guinea, the Philippines, Singapore, South Africa, Switzerland, Thailand, the United Kingdom, the United States , and Vanuatu.

The Revival Fellowship is led by a Council of Pastors from around the world. The chairman is Pastor Paul Nobel, who is based in Adelaide, South Australia.

History

The Revival Fellowship was formed as a result of a 1995 schism with the Revival Centres International. At a Christmas church camp in 1994 Lloyd Longfield (head-pastor of the Revival Centres International) instituted a policy that sexual defaulters would be permanently excommunicated and could never be restored to fellowship. The Adelaide assembly, led by pastor John Kuhlmann, opposed the move - withdrawing from the Revival Centres with approximately half of the assemblies (30), a third of pastors (35) and probably over half of the membership (3,300 including 120 from Melbourne - the bulk of membership outside of Victoria and Tasmania). Approximately half of the missions work in Papua New Guinea became part of the Revival Fellowship (15,000 people), as well as various other international assemblies (including assemblies in Europe, Africa, New Zealand, the Pacific and the Americas).

Doctrine

Salvation
The Revival Fellowship teaches that one receives salvation by repentance, water baptism by full immersion, and the receiving of the Holy Spirit. They preach the outward manifestation of a person who is filled with the Holy Spirit is to be found in the biblical experience of "speaking in tongues" as seen in Acts 2:4, Acts10:44.

Scriptures quoted by the Revival Fellowship to justify its position on salvation include Acts 2 (particularly the first few verses, which record speaking in tongues on the day of Pentecost, and Acts 2:38, which is included in the group's logo), Mark 16:15-20, Acts 10:44-48, Acts 19:1-6 and John 3:1-21 (particularly verses 1–9). Their doctrine regarding speaking in tongues emphasises glossolalia (an unintelligible, linguistically defined non-language; e.g. Acts 10:46, 1 Cor 14:2) over xenoglossa  (a linguistically defined language; e.g. Acts 2:8).

Miracles
The Revival Fellowship believe in miracles from God, and many claim to have experienced miraculous healings. Testimonies, consisting largely of stories about receiving the Holy Spirit and claims of healings and miracles, are often shared in fellowship meetings and publications.

The Revival Fellowship has large groups in various Third World countries, including Papua New Guinea, where there are many claims of its members being healed of HIV/AIDS and being raised from the dead.

Bible Prophecy and Other Topics
Other topics are often preached or discussed, but they are not given the same emphasis as the salvation message and are not considered doctrinal.

The Revival Fellowship preaches a modified form of historicist interpretation of Bible prophecy, and holds to the mid-twentieth century British-Israel religious theory as an important part of interpreting Bible prophecy, although racist elements of the teaching are denied.

Other topics, including Bible Numerics, British Israel and prophecy related to the Great Pyramid of Giza and America are accepted.

The Revival Fellowship is highly critical of the science of evolution and instead preaches a form of special creation; they do not believe in a literal six-day creation, or in the priority of Adam as the first human being.

In English speaking countries, the Authorized King James Versions (KJV) or The Amplified Bible (AMP) bible is preferred.

Members prophesy to each other during gatherings through 1st person speech (that is, in the person of God, as it were). This is understood by the congregation to mean that God is speaking his message to the church via the person doing the prophesying.

Meetings operate the three voice gifts of the Holy Spirit: tongues followed by interpretation; and prophecy in accord with 1Corinthians 14.

See also
 Christian Assemblies International
 Revival Centres International

References

External links
Official website

Pentecostal denominations
Protestantism in Australia
Christian organizations established in 1995